The president of the Senate is the presiding officer of the upper chamber of the legislature of Cambodia.

The Senate was created in 1972 during the Khmer Republic replacing the previous upper house, the Council of Kingdom.

Presidents of the Senate

Presidents of the Council of Kingdom

Presidents of the Council of Kingdom from 1947 to 1972. There were 24 members in the council. The Constitution of 1947 established the Council of Kingdom to provide "advice" on the adoption of laws. Members were appointed by the king and the National Assembly.

References

Senate, President
Cambodia, Senate
1972 establishments in Cambodia